William Carrique Ponsonby (c.1713 – 27 June 1774) was a major in the Kerry Militia, a lawyer, high sheriff, justice of the peace and grand juror of County Kerry, and a significant Irish landowner.

He was born as William Carrique, the first of four surviving children of Rose Ponsonby, daughter of Susannah (née Grice) and Thomas Ponsonby of Crotta, and John Carrique; like the Ponsonbys, the Carrique family (specifically John Carrique, William's grandfater) were granted confiscated lands in the forfeitures of 1688. His younger siblings were Alice, Honora and Anne. He was educated at Eton College and Trinity College, Dublin, matriculating at the latter on 9 February 1729. He was accepted into the Inner Temple of lawyers in 1731. In 1735, he married Anne Dorothy Crosbie, daughter of Lady Margaret Barry and Thomas Crosbie, former member of parliament for Kerry and Dingle and high sheriff of Kerry. Their only child, James, was born in 1738. In 1736 he is recorded as a resident justice of the peace in Kerry, in 1747 and 1755 as a member of the grand jury and in 1750 as high sheriff.

On 10 February 1762, his uncle, former member of parliament Richard Ponsonby, brother to Rose's father, willed his estate at Crotta to Carrique with the agreement that he and his son should take the Ponsonby family name. Ponsonby died in 1673 and his will was proved the following year; William Carrique and his son James bore the surname Carrique Ponsonby thereafter.

In 1766, he remarried to Margaret Crosbie (d.1793), daughter of Elizabeth (née Sandes) and Arthur Crosbie. In 1770, he was party to a case concerning the leasing of parts of his inherited land to members of the Swayne family (and through them others) from contracts going back to 1695. He died on 27 June 1774 at Cloghers (now part of Tralee), survived by his wife and son. His will, which was written on 22 January 1773 wasn't proved until 18 July 1782 but referenced his wife Margaret, his son James and grandson William.

References

18th-century Irish landowners
Irish landlords
1713 births
1774 deaths
Irish justices of the peace
High Sheriffs of Kerry
Alumni of Trinity College Dublin